The Malaysian Masters was a non-ranking snooker tournament staged on three occasions in 1984, 1986 and 1996. 

The first tournament was played as a round-robin in 1984, with Terry Griffiths winning the tournament by topping the group. The tournament was not played the following season, but returned in a knockout format in 1986, with Jimmy White winning by defeating Dennis Taylor 2–1 in the final. A third tournament was held in 1996 for lower-ranked players; Dominic Dale won the first professional tournament of his career by defeating Drew Henry 8–3 in the final.

Winners

References

 
Snooker non-ranking competitions
Recurring sporting events established in 1984
Recurring events disestablished in 1996
Defunct snooker competitions